Devabhuti, also known as Devbhomi', was the last king of the Shunga Empire in ancient India. He was assassinated by his minister Vasudeva Kanva. Following his death, the Shunga dynasty was then replaced by the subsequent Kanvas.

Reign
The later Shunga kings after Pushyamitra Shunga, had little power and were puppets in the hands of their ministers. According to Bana's Harshacharita, he was killed by his Chief minister Vasudeva Kanva with help of the daughter of a servant woman of Devabhuti, who disguised herself as his queen.

He is said to have been overfond of the company of women & overindulging in sensual pleasures.

References

Citations

Sources
 
"Dictionary of Buddhism" by Damien Keown (Oxford University Press, 2003) 
 
"Aśoka and the decline of the Mauryas" Romila Thaper (London 1961).
"The Yuga Purana", John E. Mitchiner, Kolkata, The Asiatic Society, 2002, 

Year of birth unknown
73 BC deaths
Rulers of Bengal
Assassinated Indian people
Murdered Indian monarchs
1st-century BC Indian monarchs
People murdered in India
1st-century BC murdered monarchs